Coleophora jaernaensis is a moth of the family Coleophoridae. It is found in Sweden, Finland, Latvia and Germany.

Adults are on wing in June and July.

References

External links

jaernaensis
Moths described in 2002
Moths of Europe